Wabash Trail may refer to:

 Trails following the old Wabash Railroad line.
Wabash Trail (Sangamon County), Illinois
Wabash Heritage Trail, Indiana
Wabash Cannonball Trail, Ohio

See also
Wabash Trace, a rail trail in Iowa